Tozier is a surname. Notable people with the surname include:

Albert E. Tozier (1860–1937), American newspaper editor and local historian 
Andrew J. Tozier (1838–1910), American Civil War veteran
Charles T. Tozier (1832–1899), American politician
Rachel Tozier (born 1992), American sport shooter